Ragnar Josephson (Stockholm 8 March 1891 - Lund 27 March 1966) was a Swedish art historian and writer. 

Josephson was professor of art history at Lund University 1929-1957 and founder of the Archive for Decorative Art there. He was director of the Royal Dramatic Theatre in Stockholm 1948-1951, and was elected a member of the Swedish Academy in 1960.

Notes

References
Landquist, John: "Josephson, Ragnar", Svenskt biografiskt lexikon, 20 (1973-1975), pp. 438–441.

External links
 

1891 births
1966 deaths
Writers from Stockholm
Swedish art historians
Members of the Swedish Academy
Swedish Jews